The Oklahoma State University Ferguson College of Agriculture (previously Oklahoma State University College of Agricultural Sciences and Natural Resources (CASNR ) )serves as the agricultural component of OSU-Stillwater in Stillwater, Oklahoma and operates within the university's Division of Agricultural Sciences and Natural Resources (DASNR). Agriculture has been a part of Oklahoma State University since the school's inception in 1890, when it was known as Oklahoma Agricultural & Mechanical College. Today the College of Agricultural Sciences and Natural Resources has emerged as one of the top agricultural institutions amongst Big 12 Conference schools and throughout the United States.

Oklahoma State operates a network of agricultural experiment stations and the Oklahoma Cooperative Extension Service, which has a presence in all 77 counties throughout the state of Oklahoma. OSU experiment stations cover Oklahoma's diverse terrain, from the dense forests of McCurtain County to the prairie and plains of western Oklahoma. Experiment stations currently operate in the Oklahoma cities of Stillwater, Goodwell, Woodward, Bessie, Lahoma, Haskell, Perkins, Chickasha, Fort Cobb, Altus, Mangum, Tipton, Lane, Bixby, and Idabel.

Academic programs
 Agricultural Economics
 Agricultural Education, Communications, and Leadership
 Animal Science
 Biochemistry and Molecular Biology
 Biosystems and Agricultural Engineering
 Entomology and Plant Pathology
 Environmental Sciences
 Natural Resource Ecology and Management
 Food Science
 Horticulture and Landscape Architecture
 Plant and Soil Sciences

External links
OSU College of Agricultural Sciences and Natural Resources
OSU DASNR
OSU DASNR Extension
OSU DASNR Research

Oklahoma State University
Agricultural universities and colleges in the United States